The men's freestyle 74 kilograms is a competition featured at the 2022 World Wrestling Championships, and was held in Belgrade, Serbia on 16 and 17 September 2022.

Results
Legend
F — Won by fall

Finals

Top half

Section 1

Section 2

Bottom half

Section 3

Section 4

Repechage

Final standing 

 Frank Chamizo of Italy originally won the bronze medal, but was disqualified after he tested positive for cannabis.

References

External links
Official website

Men's freestyle 74 kg